The lungs is one of the zang organs described in traditional Chinese medicine. It is a functionally-defined entity and not equivalent to the anatomical organ of the same name.

In the context of the zang-fu organs
The Lung is a zang organ meaning it is a yin organ. Situated in the thorax, it communicates with the throat and opens into the nose. It occupies the uppermost position among the zang-fu organs, and is known as the "canopy" of the zang-fu organs. Due to the lung's position in the body, toward the back of the chest and in the upper half of the abdomen, it has yang qualities and is more yang than other zang organs besides the heart. Each zang organ is paired with a fu organ, the lung's paired organ is the large intestine. Its meridians connects with the large intestine, with which makes it internally related. The lung and large intestine are connected by two meridians, Yangming large intestine meridian of hand and the Taiyin lung meridian of hand. The Lung and its paired organ are associated with the element of metal and the emotion of grief. Each of the Five Elements have a color associated with them. Due to its association with metal, the lungs are associated with the color white. The peak time for the Lungs is from 3–5 am.  Illnesses that are rooted in the lung are most commonly due to improper qi or water regulation. Common symptoms iindicating lung disease are coughing, weak voice, asthma, and fish smelling mucus or saliva.

Lung functions
The Lung has five principle functions:
governing qi and controlling respiration. They take in clear and expel turbid Natural Air Qi (Kong Qi)
controlling disseminating and descending
regulating the water passages
controlling the skin and body hair
opening into the nose
housing the Po

Dominating qi and controlling respiration
Dominating qi has two aspects: dominating the qi of respiration and dominating the qi of the entire body. Dominating the qi of respiration means the lung is a respiratory organ through which the qi of the exterior and the qi from the interior are able to mingle. Via the lung, the body inhales clear qi from the natural environment and exhales waste qi from the interior of the body. Dominating qi of the entire body means that the function of the lung in respiration greatly influences the functional activities of the body, and is closely related to the formation of pectoral qi, which is formed from the combination of the essential qi of water and food, and the clear qi inhaled by the lung. When the lung's function of dominating qi is normal, the passage of qi will be unobstructed and respiration will be normal and smooth. Deficiency of lung qi may lead to general fatigue, feeble speech, weak respiration, shortness of breath and excessive perspiration.

Dominating descending and regulating the water passages
As a general rule, the upper zang-fu organs have the function of descending, and the lower zang-fu organs the function of ascending. Since the lung is the uppermost zang organ, its qi descends to promote the circulation of qi and body fluid through the body and to conduct them downwards. Dysfunction of the lung in descending may lead to upward perversion of lung qi with symptoms such as cough and shortness of breath. 

Regulating the water passages means to regulate the pathways for the circulation and excretion of water. Circulation of body fluids is a function of many organs working together as a team, including the lungs. The role of the lung in promoting and maintaining water metabolism depends on the descending function of lung qi. Under normal circumstances, the lungs are capable of sending fluids downwards to the kidneys, which pass the fluids to the bladder for excretion. Dysfunction may result in dysuria, oliguria, and oedema.

Notes

Bibliography
Cheng, X.-n., Deng, L., & Cheng, Y. (Eds.). (1987). Chinese Acupuncture And Moxibustion. Beijing: Foreign Languages Press
Lu, Henry C. (1994). “Chinese Natural Cures” New York, NY: Black Dog & Leventhal Publishing
Maciocia, G. (2005). The Foundations Of Chinese Medicine: A Comprehensive Text For Acupuncturists And Herbalists. Philadelphia, MA: Elseverier Churchill Livingstone. 
Zhiya, Z., Yanchi, L., Ruifu, Z. & Dong, L. (1995). Advanced Textbook On Traditional Chinese Medicine And Pharmacology (Vol. I) . Beijing: New World Press.
Yin, H.-h., & Shuai, H.-c. (1992). Fundamentals Of Traditional Chinese Medicine. Beijing, China: Foreign Languages Press.
Li, Zhongzi; (2010). Huangdi Neijing : a synopsis with commentaries. Y.C. Kong. Hong Kong. 
Pachuta, Donald M., (1991). Chinese Medicine: The Law of Five Elements. New Delhi, India: India International Centre. 

Traditional Chinese medicine